Poland competed at the 1990 European Athletics Championships in Split, Yugoslavia, from 27 August - 1 September 1990. A delegation of 18 athletes were sent to represent the country.

Medals

References

European Athletics Championships
1990
Nations at the 1990 European Athletics Championships